Rye Town Hall is an historic town hall located at 10 Central Road in Rye, New Hampshire. Constructed in 1839 and purchased by the town in 1873, it was listed on the National Register of Historic Places in 2020, and the New Hampshire State Register of Historic Places in 2013.

History
The building was constructed in 1839 to serve as a Methodist church. It filled that role for approximately 30 years, after which it fell into disuse. In 1873, the building was purchased by the town of Rye for $1000, with an additional $2658 spent on renovations. This included adding to the front of the building, along with moving the bell tower forward. At some point, believed to be in the final quarter of the 19th century, the building was raised to add a ground-level story. Further additions to the building were constructed by the town in 1890 and 1911.

See also
National Register of Historic Places listings in Rockingham County, New Hampshire

References

External links
 Town hall drawing with dimensions at town.rye.nh.us

City and town halls on the National Register of Historic Places in New Hampshire
National Register of Historic Places in Rockingham County, New Hampshire
Greek Revival architecture in New Hampshire
Churches completed in 1839
1839 establishments in New Hampshire
Buildings and structures in Rockingham County, New Hampshire
Rye, New Hampshire